Wild West Romance is a 1928 American silent Western film directed by R.L. Hough, and written by Jack Cunningham and Delos Sutherland. The film stars Rex Bell, Caryl Lincoln, Neil Neely, Billy Butts, Jack Walters, and Fred Parker. The film was released on June 10, 1928, by Fox Film Corporation.

Plot
A ne'er-do-well cowboy named Phil (Rex Bell) defeats a bandit and wins the love of a minister's daughter (Caryl Lincoln).

Cast    
 Rex Bell as Phil O'Malley
 Caryl Lincoln as Ruth Thorndyke
 Neil Neely as Brake Martin
 Billy Butts as The Kid
 Jack Walters as Sheriff
 Fred Parker as Beef Strickland
 Al Baffert as Blacksmith 
 George C. Pearce as Rev. William Thorndyke 
 Ellen Woonston as Mrs. Breez

References

External links
 

1928 films
1920s English-language films
1928 Western (genre) films
Fox Film films
American black-and-white films
Silent American Western (genre) films
1920s American films